D524 is a state road in the central Croatia connecting the D28 in Predavac and the D43 near Letičani, comprising the northern bypass of the city of Bjelovar.

The road, as well as all other state roads in Croatia, is managed and maintained by Hrvatske ceste, state owned company.

Traffic volume 

Traffic is regularly counted and reported by Hrvatske ceste, operator of the road.

Road junctions and populated areas

Sources

See also
 State roads in Croatia
 Hrvatske ceste

State roads in Croatia
Bjelovar-Bilogora County